The 1972 Monte Carlo Open was a men's tennis tournament played on outdoor clay courts at the Monte Carlo Country Club in Roquebrune-Cap-Martin, France. The tournament was part of the WCT Tour, which was incorporated into the 1972 Commercial Union Assurance Grand Prix circuit. It was the 66th edition of the event and was held from 27 March through 3 April 1972. Ilie Năstase won the singles title.

Finals

Singles
 Ilie Năstase defeated  František Pála 6–1, 6–0, 6–3
 It was Năstase's 3rd singles title of the year and the 12th of his career.

Doubles
 Patrice Beust /  Daniel Contet defeated  Jiří Hřebec /  František Pála 3–6, 6–1, 12–10, 6–2

References

External links
 
 ATP tournament profile
 ITF tournament edition details

Monte Carlo Open
Monte-Carlo Masters
Monte Carlo Open
Monte
Monte Carlo Open
Monte Carlo Open